The Black Corsair (Italian: Il corsaro nero) is a 1937 Italian adventure film directed by Amleto Palermi and starring Ciro Verratti, Silvana Jachino and Ada Biagini. The film is an adaptation of the 1898 novel The Black Corsair by Emilio Salgari.

Cast
 Ciro Verratti as Emilio Ventimiglia, the Black Corsair
 Silvana Jachino as Honorata 
 Ada Biagini as Amy 
 Nerio Bernardi as Van Gould, Gouvernor of Maracaibo 
 Piero Carnabuci as Giovanni 
 Cesco Baseggio as Van Stiller, Corsair
 Checco Durante as Carmeau, Corsair
 Guido Celano as Morgan, Corsair
 Olinto Cristina as Rabouillon, Spanish Commander
 C. Conti as Stoik, Spanish Sergeant

References

Bibliography 
 Moliterno, Gino. The A to Z of Italian Cinema. Scarecrow Press, 2009.

External links 
 

1937 films
Italian historical adventure films
1930s historical adventure films
1930s Italian-language films
Films directed by Amleto Palermi
Films set in the Caribbean
Films set in the 1660s
Films based on The Corsairs of the Antilles
Italian black-and-white films
Cultural depictions of Henry Morgan
Films scored by Alessandro Cicognini
1930s Italian films